Qasabeh-ye Gharbi Rural District is a rural district (dehestan) in the Central District of Sabzevar County, Razavi Khorasan Province, Iran. At the 2006 census, its population was 8,701, in 2,589 families.  The rural district has 24 villages.

References 

Rural Districts of Razavi Khorasan Province
Sabzevar County